Domen Bratož (born March 23, 1993) is a Slovenian professional basketball player for Podgorica. He is a 1.89 m tall point guard.

References

External links
 ABA League Profile
 Fiba Profile
 Eurobasket.com profile

1993 births
Living people
ABA League players
KK Cedevita Olimpija players
KK Krka players
KK Šentjur players
Rapla KK players
Sportspeople from Novo Mesto
Point guards
Slovenian men's basketball players
Slovenian expatriate basketball people in Estonia
Slovenian expatriate basketball people in Montenegro